John Hall (born 23 October 1994) is an Australian professional footballer who plays as a goalkeeper for Croydon Kings in the National Premier Leagues South Australia.

Early-life

Hall grew up in Adelaide, South Australia where he attended Prince Alfred College.

Club career

Adelaide United
Hall signed for Adelaide United in 2012.

In the 2014–15 A-League season, he made his senior debut against the Newcastle Jets replacing Paul Izzo in the 59th minute in a 7–0 victory.

At the start of the 2015–16 A-League season, Hall replaced Eugene Galekovic due to Socceroos duty and later a knee injury.

In August 2015, Hall signed a two-year contract extension with Adelaide.

Western Sydney Wanderers
On 22 May 2017, Hall signed with the Western Sydney Wanderers as a replacement for the injured Jerrad Tyson. In January 2018, Hall departed Western Sydney Wanderers following the conclusion of his contract and Tyson returning to full fitness.

Honors 

Adelaide United
 A-League Premiership: 2015/16
 FFA Cup: 2014

References

External links
 

1994 births
Living people
Australian soccer players
Association football goalkeepers
Cumberland United FC players
Adelaide United FC players
Western Sydney Wanderers FC players
Sydney United 58 FC players
Croydon Kings players
A-League Men players
National Premier Leagues players
Soccer players from Adelaide